Ocotea langsdorffii is a species of plant in the family Lauraceae.

It is an evergreen tree in the genus Ocotea.

Distribution
It is endemic to Minas Gerais state in Brazil.

It occurs within the Cerrado ecoregion, in low densities in a restricted area of the Serra do Cipó mountain range.

Conservation
It is an IUCN Red List Vulnerable species, threatened by habitat loss.  It is also included on the official list of threatened Brazilian plants compiled by IBAMA.

Trees are indiscriminately cut for timber, at levels of exploitation that are unsustainable. Minas Gerais state laws to protect species populations within Serra do Cipó State Botanical Park are not well enforced yet.

References

langsdorffii
Endemic flora of Brazil
Flora of Minas Gerais
Flora of the Cerrado
Trees of Brazil
Vulnerable flora of South America
Taxonomy articles created by Polbot